Yorgos Karamihos (born on January 3, 1974) is a Greek actor.

Biography

Yorgos Karamihos is a graduate of the History Department of the Ionian University and the Higher School of Dramatic Art of the National Theater of Greece. He has a long career in the theater, with performances at the National Theater. He also appeared in many movies and TV productions, including The Durrells (2016–2019), a British TV series, where he played Theodore Stephanides.

References

1974 births
Greek male actors
Living people
People from Veria